Dendrology (dendron, "tree"; and , -logia, science of or study of) or xylology (ksulon, "wood") is the science and study of woody plants (trees, shrubs, and lianas), specifically, their taxonomic classifications. There is no sharp boundary between plant taxonomy and dendrology; woody plants not only belong to many different plant families, but these families may be made up of both woody and non-woody members. Some families include only a few woody species. Dendrology, as a discipline of industrial forestry, tends to focus on identification of economically useful woody plants and their taxonomic interrelationships.  As an academic course of study, dendrology will include all woody plants, native and non-native, that occur in a region.  A related discipline is the study of sylvics, which focuses on the autecology of genera and species.

Relationship with botany 

Dendrology is a branch of botany that specializes in the characterization and identification of woody plants, while botany is the study of all types of general plants.

Noted dendrologists
Mike Baillie, Queen's University of Belfast
Francis A. Bartlett, founder of Bartlett Arboretum and Gardens and the Bartlett Tree Research Laboratory
Ludwig Beissner
William Douglas Cook, founder of Eastwoodhill Arboretum and Pukeiti (New Zealand)
Michael Dirr
Maciej Giertych
 Owen Johnson
Humphry Marshall
Alan Mitchell
 Alfred Rehder
 Viscount Philippe de Spoelberch

Gallery

See also

Dendrochronology
Silviculture
World Forestry Congress

References

External links

Iowa State - Dendrology
Forest Biology and Dendrology Educational Sites at Virginia Tech
Dendrology information and other tree identification resources